Racksen is a municipality in the district of Altenkirchen, in Rhineland-Palatinate, in western Germany. It has 141 inhabitants (Dec. 2020).

References

Altenkirchen (district)